The Philippine Veterans Affairs Office (PVAO) (Filipino: Tanggapan para sa Kapakanan ng mga Beteranong Pilipino) is the Philippine agency for Filipino war veterans. Under the Department of National Defense, PVAO serves to fulfill a national commitment as embodied in Section 7, Article XVI of the 1987 Philippine Constitution:

“The State shall provide immediate and adequate care, benefits and other forms of assistance to war veterans and veterans of military campaigns, their surviving spouses and orphans. Funds shall be provided therefor and due consideration shall be given them in the disposition of agricultural lands of the public domain and, in appropriate cases, in the utilization of natural resources.”

PVAO's core functions include the administration of veteran’s pension and benefits, memorialization of veterans’ heroic deeds, and promotion of policies and management of services for veterans’ affairs and welfare.

Veterans Memorial Medical Center
The Veterans Memorial Medical Center provides hospitalization, medical care and treatment to veterans and their dependents.

National Military Shrines

The former Military Shrines Service which is responsible for the    administration, maintenance and development of national shrines of military and historic significance, has been renamed as Veterans Memorial and Historical Division (VMHD) and is now a division under PVAO. From six national shrines, it now administers a total of ten military shrines, namely:

Balantang Memorial Cemetery National Shrine
Ricarte National Shrine
Capas National Shrine
Mount Samat National Shrine
Bantayog Sa Kiangan
Libingan ng mga Bayani
USAFIP-NL National Shrine & Park
PEFTOK-Korean War Memorial Hall
Corregidor National Shrine (under lease by the Department of Tourism)
Balete Pass National Shrine

See also
Department of National Defense
Philippine Veterans Bank

External links
PVAO Homepage

References 

Vet
Vet
Phi
Establishments by Philippine presidential decree